Kristoffer Askildsen (born 9 January 2001) is a Norwegian professional footballer who plays as a midfielder for  club Lecce, on loan from Sampdoria. He also represents the Norway national team.

Career

Early career 
Askildsen began his career in Heming, joining Stabæk's academy in his late childhood. He joined the club initially as a goalkeeper, but converted to midfield whilst playing under the guidance of Stabæk's youth coach Øyvind Leonhardsen.

Stabæk 
Askildsen made his debut for the senior team against Ranheim in September 2018, and established himself as a starter in April 2019.

Sampdoria 
Askildsen signed with Italian side Sampdoria on 28 January 2020 on a four-and-a-half year contract. On 21 June 2020, he made his debut with the club in an away 2–1 loss against Inter Milan. He scored his first goal against Milan in a 4–1 loss. In doing so, Askildsen became the first player born after the Millennium to score for Sampdoria.

Loan to Lecce 
On 17 July 2022, Askildsen joined Lecce on a season-long loan.

Career statistics

References

External links
 

Living people
2001 births
Footballers from Oslo
Association football midfielders
Norwegian footballers
Stabæk Fotball players
Eliteserien players
U.C. Sampdoria players
U.S. Lecce players
Serie A players
Norway youth international footballers
Norway under-21 international footballers
Norway international footballers
Norwegian expatriate footballers
Norwegian expatriate sportspeople in Italy
Expatriate footballers in Italy